Extra MSA Services Ltd is a company which operates nine motorway service stations in England, mainly on primary routes. It is based at Beaconsfield services, previously being in the centre of Lincoln. It is also known as Extra MSA Forecourts Ltd.

Many of the brands at Extra locations including M&S Simply Food, Costa Coffee and Greggs are operated by Moto, the UK's largest service area operator and Extra's biggest competitor.

Market position
Extra is the fourth largest service station operator in the UK behind Moto (1st), Welcome Break (2nd) and RoadChef (3rd). It came into operation after the government deregulated motorway services to encourage more competition and its first site opened in December 2000, at Cambridge. Peterborough opened in January 2001 and Baldock in July 2001.

Outlets

Service stations 

Extra developed its first three service stations at a cost of £60 million. The parent company was set up in 1992 by Stephen Spouge, who is now Chairman. Its service stations are designed by Nash and Partners of West Sussex. The fuel reservoirs are built by WEFCO of Gainsborough. It originally planned 17 service stations and currently operates a total of nine service stations, and two petrol stations at competitor owned sites:
 Baldock - A1/A1(M) J10, via A507
 Beaconsfield - M40 J2, via A355
 Blackburn with Darwen - M65 J4
 Cambridge - A14 J28
 Cullompton - M5 J28
 Peterborough -  A1/A1(M) J17, via A605
 Cobham - M25 between J9 & J10
 Leeds Skelton Lake - M1 J45

Petrol stations with basic services 
 Tibshelf (formerly Chesterfield) - M1 between J28 & J29
 Winchester - M3 between J8 & J9

Future stations 
Extra is currently the fastest developing service station operator in the UK with three areas opening, one each year up to 2010. The most recent station to open was at Leeds Skelton Lake in March 2020. Future sites plan to maximise areas of the road system that have few service areas, and will be developed by Swayfields Ltd, who own the Extra company.

Service stations due to open:
 Sheffield - M1 J35
 Solihull - M42 between J5 & J6

Proposed stations:
 Chalfont St Peter - M25 between J16 and J17

Facilities

Restaurants
 Burger King
 McDonald's
 KFC
 Chopstix
 El Mexicana
 JD Wetherspoon
 Greggs (operated by Moto)
 Leon
 Nando's
 Wrapchic
 Carvery Express
 Chozen Noodle
Chozen Sushi
 Tossed

Coffee houses
 Starbucks
 Costa Coffee (operated by Moto)

Retail outlets
 WHSmith
 M&S Simply Food (operated by Moto)
 Quicksilver gambling/amusement arcades
Top Gifts

Petrol stations
 Shell
 BP

Hotels
 Days Inn
Ramada
 Travelodge
 ibis Budget

See also
 Rest area
 Moto
 Welcome Break
 RoadChef

References

Further reading
 Independent April 2008
 Times April 2008
 Forecourt Trader September 2007
 Property Week September 2006
 Business Weekly November 2000

External links
 Extra (Official Website)
 Motorway Services Online - Extra

Catering and food service companies of the United Kingdom
British companies established in 2000
Retail companies established in 2000
Food and drink companies established in 2000
Hospitality companies established in 2000
Companies based in Buckinghamshire
Companies based in Lincoln, England
South Bucks District